"My Silver Lining" is a song recorded by Swedish folk band First Aid Kit for their third studio album Stay Gold. Written by Klara and Johanna Söderberg and produced by Mike Mogis, the song was released as the first single from the album. One of the duo's most popular songs, "My Silver Lining" is often performed during the encore of their concerts.

Use in media
"My Silver Lining" was used in the "lightsuit" segment of the short ski film Afterglow, the soundtrack of Wanted (2016 Australian TV series) season 3 episode 5, as the end credits theme in the fifth and final episode of the Telltale Games series Tales from the Borderlands, in the fifth episode of the third season of The Umbrella Academy,  and as the ending music for the final episode of Bad Sisters (TV series).
This song has also been used for three TV adverts in the UK; American Express, Mercedes Benz and Renault.

Charts

Weekly charts

Year-end charts

Certifications

References

2014 singles
First Aid Kit (band) songs
2014 songs
Columbia Records singles